Bailey Matthews (born 2006) is a British schoolboy, from Worksop, who has won awards for his sporting achievements in the face of his  cerebral palsy. Matthews made international headlines in 2015 after completing his first junior triathlon (a  swim, then a  bike ride, ending with a  run), at Castle Howard in July 2015, after throwing away his walking frame to complete the last  of the final section on his own, despite stumbling twice. A video of the moment, captured by a spectator, went viral, being viewed more than 27 million times on Facebook.

Bailey Matthews received a Pride of Britain Award and numerous other awards, and in December the same year, he was presented with the BBC Sports Personality of the Year Helen Rollason Award at a ceremony in Belfast.

References

External links 
 Video of Matthews finishing his triathlon - on YouTube

Sportspeople with cerebral palsy
Sportspeople from Doncaster
2006 births
Living people
Year of birth uncertain
English male triathletes
British disabled sportspeople